The Curtis Yelland House is a historic building located in Mason City, Iowa, United States.  Frank Lloyd Wright associate William Drummond designed this Prairie School style house, completed in 1910.  The house features a strong horizontal emphasis, broad hip roofs, board-and-batten siding, stucco on the upper-story, and a centrally located fireplace and chimney round which the open plan interior revolves.  The main entry is on the side of the house.  The only entry to the front porch is from the living room.  It was listed on the National Register of Historic Places in 1980.  The house suffered a devastating fire in 2008, and was almost torn down.  However, developer Jeff Tierney bought the property and restored the house in 2010.

References

Houses completed in 1910
Prairie School architecture in Iowa
Houses in Mason City, Iowa
National Register of Historic Places in Mason City, Iowa
Houses on the National Register of Historic Places in Iowa